Bailando 2019 is the fourteenth season of Bailando por un Sueño. It began airing on April 30, 2019, on the El Trece network.

Cast

Couples
On April 15, the celebrities and professional partners were announced were officially confirmed at the press conference to present the program.

Hosts and judges 

Marcelo Tinelli return as host, while judges Marcelo Polino, Ángel de Brito and Florencia Peña returned this season. Pampita Ardohaín return to the show as a judge following a hiatus. Laura Fernández did not return this season as a judge.

The BAR (Bailando Assistant Referee) will be in this edition again. Would integrated by Anibal Pachano, Flavio Mendoza and Laura Fidalgo. Lourdes Sánchez, Mariela Anchipi and Jorge Moliniers did not return this season as members of BAR, although they did return to the show as participants. Only the judges, choreographers, the head of coach and Marcelo Tinelli can ask for the BAR. The order is made after the judges score. In gala, each member of the BAR will have the possibility of adding or subtracting a point. In the duel, the BAR can save a couple. , Carmen Barbieri replaces Flavio Mendoza.

Scoring chart 

Red numbers indicate the lowest score for each style.
Green numbers indicate the highest score for each style.
 Indicates the couple sentenced.
 Indicates the couple was saved by the judges or BAR.
 Indicates the couple was saved by production. 
 Indicates the couple was saved by the public.
 Indicates the couple eliminated that round.
 Indicates  the couple sentenced for the next duel. 
 Indicates the couple withdrew.
 Indicates the winning couple.
 Indicates the runner-up couple.
 Indicates the semi-finalists couples.

Notes:
 In italics, partial scores without the secret ballot.
A: All couples are sent to duel to define the semifinalists.
S: Sanction (sentenced) 
 "—" indicates the couple(s) did not dance that round.

Highest and lowest scoring performances
The best and worst performances in each dance according to the judges' (more the BAR) 43-point scale are as follows:

Styles, scores and songs

Round 1: Disco 

      Sentenced: Leticia Brédice (14),  Silvina Escudero (20) and  Felipe Colombo & Stefanía Roitman (21) 
      Saved by the judges: Silvina Escudero
      Saved by the public:  Leticia Brédice (51.22%) 
      Eliminated: Felipe Colombo & Stefanía Roitman (48.78%)

Round 2: Latin pop 

      Sentenced: Leticia Brédice (5), Luciana Salazar (19), Charlotte Caniggia (20), Sofía Pachano & Dan Breitman (20) and Julián Serrano & Sofía Morandi (20)
      Saved by the judges or BAR: Sofía Pachano & Dan Breitman, Julián Serrano & Sofía Morandi and Charlotte Caniggia
      Saved by production: Leticia Brédice and Luciana Salazar

Round 3: Trio Salsa 

      Sentenced: Charlotte Caniggia (13), Julián Serrano & Sofía Morandi (13), Luciana Salazar (15), Sofía Pachano & Dan Breitman (16), Hernán Piquín & Macarena Rinaldi (S)          
      Saved by the judges or BAR: Sofía Pachano & Dan Breitman, Luciana Salazar and Julián Serrano & Sofía Morandi
      Sentenced for the next telephone duel: Charlotte Caniggia and Hernán Piquín & Macarena Rinaldi

Round 4: Cumbia 

      Sentenced: Charlotte Caniggia (—), Hernán Piquín & Macarena Rinaldi (—),  Yanina Screpante (17),  Ezequiel Cwirkaluk & Noelia Marzol (19) and  Ailén Bechara & Cae (20) 
      Saved by the judges: Ezequiel Cwirkaluk & Noelia Marzol
      Saved by the public: Hernán Piquín & Macarena Rinaldi  (49.87%), Charlotte Caniggia (23.18%) and Ailén Bechara & Cae (16.10%) 
      Eliminated: Yanina Screpante (10.85%)
      Withdrew: Dan Breitman

Round 5: Greatest Hits 

 

      Sentenced: Silvina Escudero (—), Pedro Alfonso & Fernanda Metilli (13), Matilda Blanco (16) and Florencia Torrente (17)
      Saved by the judges or BAR: Pedro Alfonso & Fernanda Metilli and Silvina Escudero
      Saved by the public: Florencia Torrente (59.34%)
      Eliminated: Matilda Blanco (40.66%)
      Withdrew: Julián Serrano

Round 6: Cuarteto 

      Sentenced: Pedro Alfonso & Fernanda Metilli (11), Griselda Siciliani (12) and Karina Tejada (17)
      Saved by the judges: Griselda Siciliani
      Saved by the public: Karina Tejada (56.66%)
      Eliminated: Pedro Alfonso & Fernanda Metilli (43.34%)

Round 7: Music video 

      Sentenced: Ailén Bechara & Cae (14), Leticia Brédice (17), Ezequiel Cwirkaluk & Noelia Marzol (17), Rodrigo Noya & Bianca Iovenitti (22) and Lola Latorre (22)
      Saved by the judges or BAR: Lola Latorre, Rodrigo Noya & Bianca Iovenitti and Ezequiel Cwirkaluk & Noelia Marzol
      Saved by the public: Ailén Bechara & Cae (60.83%)
      Eliminated: Leticia Brédice (39.17%)
      Withdrew: Hernán Piquín

Round 8: Cha-cha-pop 

      Sentenced: Ailén Bechara (10), Rodrigo Noya & Bianca Iovenitti (12), Charlotte Caniggia (15), Federico Bal & Lourdes Sánchez (15), Cinthia Fernández & Martín Baclini (15) and Mora Godoy (20)
      Saved by the judges or BAR: Federico Bal & Lourdes Sánchez, Cinthia Fernández & Martín Baclini and Ailén Bechara
      Saved by the public: Charlotte Caniggia (47.21%)
      Eliminated: Mora Godoy (23.78%) and Rodrigo Noya & Bianca Iovenitti (29.01%)
      Withdrew: Cae

Round 9: Argentine rock

      Sentenced: Karina Tejada (11), Mariela Anchipi & Jorge Moliniers (14) and Federico Bal & Lourdes Sánchez (15)
      Saved by the judges: Federico Bal & Lourdes Sánchez
      Saved by the public: Karina Tejada (77.10%)
      Eliminated: Mariela Anchipi & Jorge Moliniers (22.90%)

Round 10: Merengue 

      Sentenced: Charlotte Caniggia (19), Sofía Morandi (20), Ailén Bechara (20) and Lola Latorre (24)
      Saved by the judges or BAR: Sofía Morandi and Lola Latorre
      Saved by the public: Charlotte Caniggia (50.79%)
      Eliminated: Ailén Bechara (49.21%)

Round 11: Duels 
In this round there will be a duel against everyone. The dueling method will be: the couple with the highest average faces the couple with the lowest average (that is, the number 1 couple in the average table versus the number 16 couple); the second best average (2) faces the second worst average (15); the third best average (3) versus the third worst average (14) and so on. The judges and the members of the BAR will choose one of the two couples, the couple that gets the most votes will be saved (and will go to the next round) and the remaining couple will continue in the next face-off. Until there are two couples, where the 7 evaluators will decide which pair will advance to the next round and which pair will be eliminated.

Average score chart
This table only counts dances scored on a 43-point scale.

Duels

1st Duel: Free Style

2nd Duel: Cuarteto

3rd Duel: Cha-cha-pop

4th Duel: Cumbia

Round 12: Tributes 

      Sentenced: Luciana Salazar (11), Federico Bal & Soledad Bayona (11), Ezequiel Cwirkaluk & Noelia Marzol (14) and Lola Latorre (18)
      Saved by the judges: Federico Bal & Soledad Bayona
      Saved by the public: Lola Latorre (39.75%)
      Eliminated: Luciana Salazar (23.37%) and Ezequiel Cwirkaluk & Noelia Marzol (36.88%)
      Withdrew: Griselda Siciliani

Round 13: Jive 

      Sentenced: Cinthia Fernández & Martín Baclini (10), Charlotte Caniggia (14), Sofía Morandi (26) and Lola Latorre (26)
      Saved by the judges and BAR: Cinthia Fernández & Martín Baclini
      Saved by the public: Charlotte Caniggia (49.38%)
      Eliminated: Lola Latorre (20.05%) and Sofía Morandi (30.57%)

Round 14: Folklore 

      Sentenced: Nicolás Occhiato (11), Charlotte Caniggia (11), Cinthia Fernández & Martín Baclini (16), Karina Tejada (20), Silvina Escudero (24) and Florencia Torrente (24)
      Saved by the judges or BAR: Nicolás Occhiato, Charlotte Caniggia and Silvina Escudero
      Saved by the public: Karina Tejada (41.02%)
      Eliminated: Cinthia Fernández & Martín Baclini (24.67%) and Florencia Torrente (34.31%)

Round 15: Duels II 
The elimination system is the same as the duels I.
In this round there will be a duel against everyone. The dueling method (based on average) will be: The first faces the eighth, the two to the seventh, the three to the sixth and the fourth with the fifth. The judges and the members of the BAR will choose one of the two couples, the couple that gets the most votes will be saved (and will go to the next round) and the remaining couple will continue in the next face-off. Until there are two couples, where the 7 evaluators will decide which pair will advance to the next round and which pair will be eliminated.

Average score chart
This table only counts dances scored on a 43-point scale.

Duels

1st Duel: Bachata

2nd Duel: Merengue

3rd Duel: Greatest Hits

Round 16: Reggaeton

      Sentenced: Nicolás Occhiato (23), Silvina Escudero (26), Florencia de la V & Gabriel Usandivaras (27) and Federico Bal & Lourdes Sánchez (28)
      Saved by the judges or BAR: Federico Bal & Lourdes Sánchez and Florencia de la V & Gabriel Usandivaras
      Saved by the public: Nicolás Occhiato (69.39%)
      Eliminated: Silvina Escudero (30.61%)

Round 17: Tributes II 

      Saved by the judges and BAR: Federico Bal & Lourdes Sánchez, Florencia Vigna & Facundo Mazzei and Nicolás Occhiato
      Saved by the public: Karina Tejada (52.52%)
      Eliminated: Florencia de la V & Gabriel Usandivaras (17.61%) and Fernando Dente & Macarena Rinaldi (29.87%)

Semifinals

1st Semi-final 

Notes
 : The point is for the couple.

Result
      Finalists: Florencia Vigna & Facundo Mazzei
      Semifinalists: Federico Bal & Lourdes Sánchez

2nd Semifinal 

Notes
 : The point is for the couple.

Result
      Finalist: Nicolás Occhiato
      Semifinalist: Karina Tejada

Final 

Notes
 : The point is for the couple.

Result:
      Winner: Nicolás Occhiato
      Runners-up: Florencia Vigna & Facundo Mazzei

References

External links

Argentina
Argentine variety television shows
2019 Argentine television seasons